U.S. Bicycle Route 76 (USBR 76) is a cross-country bicycle route east of Colorado in the United States. It is one of the two original U.S. Bicycle Routes, the other being U.S. Bicycle Route 1. USBR 76 runs from the Midwestern state of Kansas to the eastern seaboard state of Virginia. It is also known as the TransAmerica Bike Route and is contained within the TransAmerica Bicycle Trail.

A spur, U.S. Bicycle Route 176, was established in Virginia in 2016.

History

Bicycle Route 76 originated as the Bikecentennial, the route for a large bike tour organized for the 1976 celebration of the United States Bicentennial. The Adventure Cycling Association was at that time also known as the "Bikecentennial."

USBR 76 was established in 1982 as an original U.S. Bicycle Route, along with U.S. Bicycle Route 1 from Florida to Virginia. Bicycle traffic along a good deal of Bicycle Route 76 has been sparse to practically non-existent for several years. However, a 2003 conference encouraged the establishment of new interstate bicycle routes, as well as proposing the extension the two existing ones, 76's western terminus being conjectured on the Oregon coast.

Since 2014, the annual Trans Am Bike Race has used the route.

Route description

|-
| KS || 
|-
| MO || 
|-
| IL || 
|-
| KY || 
|-
| VA || 
|- class="sortbottom"
! scope="row" | Total || 
|}

Kansas
In Kansas, USBR 76 runs from the Colorado state line at K-96 near Towner, Colorado, to the Missouri state line at K-126 near Pittsburg, Kansas.

Missouri
In the state of Missouri, USBR 76 is signed. The route passes through the following counties:
 Ste. Genevieve County
 St. Francois County
 Iron County
 Reynolds County
 Shannon County
 Texas County
 Wright County
 Webster County
 Greene County
 Just east of Walnut Grove, USBR 76 intersects the  Frisco Highline Trail, which connects the route to Springfield to the south and Bolivar to the north
 Dade County
 Jasper County
 Barton County

Illinois
In the state of Illinois, USBR 76 intersects the Tunnel Hill State Trail in southern Illinois and passes through the following counties:
 Randolph County
 Jackson County
 Williamson County
 Johnson County
 Pope County
 Hardin County

Kentucky
In the state of Kentucky, USBR 76 is signed, and a map is available as part of a state bicycle tours publication.

Virginia

In the state of Virginia, part of USBR 76 is signed, and a map is available as part of a state bicycling publication.
The route passes along the following roads and through the following counties and communities:
 State Route 80 (Virginia) from Elkhorn City, Kentucky to Meadowview, Virginia in Washington County
 Buchanan County (10.9 mi.)
 Dickenson County (20.6 mi.)
 Russell County (20.1 mi.)
 Washington County (38.4 mi.)
 Meadowview to Damascus
 U.S. Route 58 from Damascus, where the route crosses the Virginia Creeper Trail and the Appalachian Trail to County Route 603 through Smyth County to Troutdale in Grayson County
 Smyth County (6.4 mi.)
 Grayson County (7.4 mi.)
 State Route 16 from Troutdale to Sugar Grove in Smyth County
 Smyth County (14.7 mi.)
 Wythe County (34.7 mi.)
 Pulaski County (23 mi.)
 City of Radford (2.6 mi.)
 Montgomery County (27.9 mi.)
 County Routes 787, 664, 600, and 666 from Radford to Christiansburg
 Ellett Road (County Route 723) from Cambria in Christiansburg to Ellett crossing the Eastern Continental Divide and passing under the Wilson Creek Bridge, second tallest bridge in Virginia, and part of the Virginia Smart Road, and passing Trinity United Methodist Church, Earhart House, and Blankenship Farm
 Lusters Gate Road (County Route 723) from Ellett to Lusters Gate passing through the Virginian Railway Underpass and New Ellett and through Ellett Valley with the North Fork of the Roanoke River to the east and the Eastern Continental Divide and Blacksburg a few miles to the west
 Catawba Road (County Route 785) from Lusters Gate to the Roanoke County line passing through Catawba Valley
 Roanoke County (13.7 mi.)
 Blacksburg Road (County Route 785) from the Montgomery County line to Catawba passing out of the Roanoke River watershed and into the Chesapeake Bay (James River) watershed
 County Route 779 from Catawba to the Botetourt County line
 Botetourt County (40.5 mi.)
 Rockbridge County (17 mi.)
 City of Lexington (3 mi.)
 Rockbridge County (27.6 mi.)
 Augusta County and Nelson County (29.8 mi)
 Just south of Waynesboro near Afton Mountain, the route runs along the Blue Ridge Parkway for about 25 miles, overlooking the Shenandoah Valley to the west and Nelson County's Rockfish Valley to the east.
 Albemarle County (38.9 mi.)
 City of Charlottesville (3.7 mi.)
 Fluvanna County (21.7 mi.)
 Goochland County (4.1 mi.)
 Louisa County (31.4 mi.)
 Hanover County (50.7 mi.)
 Henrico County (16 mi.)
 Charles City County (26.8 mi.)
 James City County (13.9 mi.)
 Along the Colonial Parkway to Yorktown
 City of Williamsburg (3.2 mi.)
 York County (11.4 mi)
 Yorktown
Total miles: 560.1

Auxiliary routes

U.S. Bicycle Route 176

U.S. Bicycle Route 176 is a  connector route that connecting USBR 1 and USBR 76 at a point a little further south than where the routes cross.

References

External links

 Adventure Cycling - TransAmerica Trail

076
Bike paths in Illinois
Bike paths in Kansas
Bike paths in Kentucky
Bike paths in Missouri
Bike paths in Virginia